Love is a 2015 erotic drama art film written and directed by Gaspar Noé. The film marked Noé's fourth directorial venture after a gap of five years. It had its premiere at the 2015 Cannes Film Festival and was released in 3D. The film is notable for its unsimulated sex scenes.

Plot
Murphy (Karl Glusman) is an American film student living in Paris. On a rainy January morning, he receives a call at the small apartment he shares with Danish partner Omi (Klara Kristin) and their 18-month-old son, Gaspar. The surprise visitor is Nora, the mother of his ex-girlfriend Electra (Aomi Muyock), who asks if Murphy knows of her daughter's whereabouts. She hasn't heard from Electra in three months, and is worried, given her issues with depression and previous suicide attempts.

For the rest of this day, Murphy recalls his relationship with Electra in a series of fragmented, nonlinear flashbacks. They depict their first meeting; their quick hook-up; and their lives over the next two years, which are filled with drug abuse, rough sex, and tender moments. Murphy and Electra eventually met and had a no-strings-attached threesome with Omi, then a young teenager, as a way to add some excitement to their love life.

However, Murphy continued his sexual relationship with Omi, without Electra's knowledge. This eventually resulted in an unplanned pregnancy, due to a broken condom. Omi refused to terminate the pregnancy, as she was against abortion. Admitting the truth to Electra ultimately ended hers and Murphy's relationship, leading to the present-day set up of Murphy and Omi raising the child together. Electra's whereabouts and ultimate fate are left unresolved at the end of the film.

Cast

Production

Initially, Noé wanted the then-married couple Monica Bellucci and Vincent Cassel to play the leads, but they took issue with the explicit, unsimulated sex.

Love is the screen debut of the film's two main actresses, Muyock and Kristin. Noé met them in a club. He found Karl Glusman for the role of Murphy through a mutual friend. The budget of the film was approximately €2.6 million. Principal photography took place in Paris. Noé has said that the film's screenplay was seven pages long.

In a pre-release interview with Marfa Journal, Noé implied that the film would have an explicitly sexual feel. He asserted that it would "give guys a hard-on and make girls cry".

The film is notable for its unsimulated sex scenes. According to NPR, "roughly half of Gaspar Noe's Love consists of raw, unsimulated sex acts – presented in 3D, no less". In most cases, the sex scenes were also not choreographed.

Gaspar Noé said that some of the sex scenes in the film are real while others are simulated. The director also preferred not to reveal which ones were simulated and leave the possibility to the spectators to detect the true from the false. "I think the experience of sex should be represented in all its power - instead of being caricatured as it is too often", he explained before specifying that he also did according to wants and needs of the actors: "I also composed with the limits of the actors. For Karl Glusman (Murphy), the representation of ejaculation was done in a natural way; actresses experience this differently and I respected their limits."

Release
The week before its debut at the 2015 Cannes Film Festival, the film's U.S. distribution rights were acquired by Alchemy. It was selected to be screened in the Vanguard section of the 2015 Toronto International Film Festival. The film also screened in The International Film Festival of Kerala, held in Thiruvananthapuram, India.

The film was refused a license to be screened in Russia.

Reception
On Rotten Tomatoes, the film holds an approval rating of 40% with an average rating of 5.1/10, based on 94 reviews. The website's critics consensus reads: "Love sees writer-director Gaspar Noé delivering some of his warmest and most personal work; unfortunately, it's also among his most undeveloped and least compelling." On Metacritic, the film has a weighted average score of 51 out of 100, based on 27 critics, indicating "mixed or average reviews".

References

External links
 
 
 
 
 

2015 films
2015 3D films
2015 drama films
2010s English-language films
2010s erotic drama films
2010s French films
2010s pregnancy films
Belgian erotic drama films
Belgian pregnancy films
English-language Belgian films
English-language French films
Films about threesomes
Films directed by Gaspar Noé
Films set in Paris
Films shot in Paris
French 3D films
French erotic drama films
French pregnancy films
Works banned in Russia